Leonard William Fielden (22 December 1903 – 25 December 1966) was an English footballer who made 39 appearances in the Football League playing as a goalkeeper for Darlington in the 1930s. He also played non-league football for clubs including South Bank and Stockton.

References

1903 births
1966 deaths
Footballers from Stockton-on-Tees
Footballers from County Durham
English footballers
Association football goalkeepers
South Bank F.C. players
Darlington F.C. players
Stockton F.C. players
English Football League players